Mima Jaušovec (born 20 July 1956) is a retired Yugoslavian tennis player. She won the 1977 French Open singles championship.

Early life
Jaušovec was born in Maribor, in present-day Slovenia, when it was part of Yugoslavia.

Career
As a girl, she was coached by Jelena Genčić, a woman whose players went on to collect 31 Grand Slam single titles. In singles, Jaušovec reached a career high of No. 6 in 1982. Her only Grand Slam triumph came in the 1977 French Open singles championship. In 1978, she again reached the final but was defeated by Virginia Ruzici. In 1983, she reached her third French Open singles final, losing to Chris Evert. Jaušovec's other tournament wins include the 1978 German Open and the 1976 Italian Open.

Jaušovec teamed with Ruzici to win the women's doubles title at the 1978 French Open. They defeated Lesley Turner Bowrey and Gail Sherriff Lovera in the final. In the same year, Jaušovec and Ruzici were the runners-up at Wimbledon, losing to Kerry Melville Reid and Wendy Turnbull. Jaušovec's other victories at Grand Slam tournaments include wins over Martina Navratilova at the 1974 Wimbledon Championships, Virginia Wade at 1976 US Open, Wendy Turnbull at 1978 Wimbledon Championships, Evonne Goolagong at 1980 Australian Open, Andrea Jaeger at 1981 Wimbledon Championships, and Sylvia Hanika at 1983 French Open.

Jaušovec retired from playing in 1988. Today, she is the head coach of the Slovenian national female tennis team. She was an unsuccessful candidate of the Liberal Democracy of Slovenia for the 2004 European Parliament election.

Grand Slam finals

Singles (1 title, 2 runners-up)

Doubles (1 title, 1 runner–up)

WTA career finals

Singles: 14 (5–9)

Doubles: 20 (11–9)

Grand Slam singles tournament timeline 

Note: The Australian Open was held twice in 1977, in January and December.

See also 
 Performance timelines for all female tennis players who reached at least one Grand Slam final

References

External links
 
 
 

1956 births
Living people
Yugoslav female tennis players
Slovenian female tennis players
French Open champions
Wimbledon junior champions
Grand Slam (tennis) champions in women's singles
Grand Slam (tennis) champions in women's doubles
Grand Slam (tennis) champions in girls' singles
Sportspeople from Maribor
Mediterranean Games gold medalists for Yugoslavia
Competitors at the 1979 Mediterranean Games
Mediterranean Games medalists in tennis